Baidyanath Prasad Mahto (2 June 1947 – 28 February 2020) was an Indian Politician and a Member of Indian Parliament to the 15th and 17th Lok Sabha. He won the 2009 and 2019 Indian general election from Valmiki Nagar constituency being a Janata Dal (United) candidate.        He was earlier elected three times to the Bihar Legislative Assembly from Nautan. He was also Minister of Rural Development Department From 2005 to 2008 in Bihar Government.

Life 
Baidyanath Prasad Mahto was Branch Manager, in National Co-operative Bank, Bettiah (Bihar) in the years 1992-95 and after that he resigned from bank manager post and became active in party politics. He also fought and lost MLA election in 1995 as Samata Party candidate and finished with second position from Nautan. After that he contested elections again in 2000 as Samata Party candidate and won from Nautan (Vidhan Sabha constituency). Following the death of Baidyanath  Prasad Mahto without  completing his term as Member of Parliament, his son Sunil Kumar won the By-election  conducted to fill the vacancy on Valmikinagar seat in 2020 on Janata Dal (United) ticket. He defeated  Pravesh Kumar Mishra of Congress.

Political career 
1995: SAP Candidate From Nautan (lost, 2nd Position)
2000: SAP Candidate From Nautan (Won First Time as MLA)
2005 (February and October): JDU Candidate From Nautan (Won 2nd and 3rd Time as MLA)
2005–2008:  Rural Development Minister, Bihar
2009–2014: MP Valmikinagar as JDU Candidate 
Chief Whip (Jdu Lok Sabha) MP Valmikinagar
Member, Committee on Chemicals and Fertilizers
Member, Committee on Papers Laid on Table
2014: Lost MP election
2019: Deputy leader of Janata Dal (United) in Lok Sabha, MP from Valmiki Nagar (Lok Sabha constituency) and Member of Rural Department

References

|-

India MPs 2009–2014
Lok Sabha members from Bihar
1947 births
2020 deaths
Janata Dal (United) politicians
Candidates in the 2014 Indian general election
India MPs 2019–present
Samata Party politicians

External links
JDU MP Baidyanath Prasad Mahto passes away after prolonged illness